The 1907 Hexham by-election was held on 27 March 1907.  The by-election was held due to the succession to the barony of Allendale of the incumbent Liberal MP, Wentworth Beaumont.  It was won by the Liberal candidate Richard Durning Holt.

History

Result

Aftermath

References

Hexham by-election
Hexham by-election
Hexham by-election
By-elections to the Parliament of the United Kingdom in Northumberland constituencies
20th century in Northumberland